Baboszewo  is a village in Płońsk County, Masovian Voivodeship, in east-central Poland. It is the seat of the gmina (administrative district) called Gmina Baboszewo.

The village has a population of 8,000.

References

Villages in Płońsk County